Serine/threonine-protein phosphatase 4 regulatory subunit 1 is an enzyme that in humans is encoded by the PPP4R1 gene.

Interactions 

PPP4R1 has been shown to interact with PPP4C.

References

Further reading